The 1990–91 Courage National 4 South was the fourth full season of rugby union within the fourth tier of the English league system, currently known as National League 2 South, and counterpart to the Courage National 4 North (now National League 2 North).  It was the first season for the division using the name National 4 South, having been known as Area League South the previous year.  In what was otherwise a very competitive league, Redruth were dominant, finishing as league champions with a perfect record of 12 wins from 12 games to gain promotion to the 1991–92 National Division 3 - 6 points clear of runners up Basingstoke.  

At the other end of the table Cheltenham and Maidenhead finished in the bottom two places and were relegated.  It was especially tough on Maidenhead who finished level with 11th placed Maidstone on 9 points each but went down due to a worst for/against ratio.  Both Cheltenham and Maidenhead would drop down to South West 1.

Structure
Each team played one match against each of the other teams, playing a total of twelve matches each. The champions are promoted to National Division 3 and the bottom two teams are relegated to either London Division 1 or South West 1 depending on their locality.

Participating teams and locations

League table

Sponsorship
National League 4 South is part of the Courage Clubs Championship and is sponsored by Courage Brewery.

References

N4
National League 2 South